Artificial Solutions is a multinational technology company that develops technology for conversational AI systems.

The company's products have been deployed in a wide range of industries including automotive, finance, energy, entertainment, telecoms, the public sector, retail and travel. It’s Customers include telecom providers such as AT&T, as well as other organisations such as Circle K  and Folksam,

The company was founded in 2001 and became a public company in 2019 after the reverse takeover of Indentive AB. Artificial Solutions is listed on the Nasdaq First North stock exchange under the ticker ASAI.

History 

Founded in Stockholm in 2001 by Johan Åhlund, Johan Gustavsson and Michael Söderström the company created interactive web assistants using a combination of artificial intelligence and natural language processing. Artificial Solutions expanded with the development of online customer service optimization products and by 2005 it had several offices throughout Europe supporting the development and sales of its online virtual assistants.

In 2008 Elbot, Artificial Solutions won the Loebner Prize.

In 2010, the company’s management changed, causing the company to focus the basis of its technology on Natural Language Interaction and launched the Teneo Platform, which allows people to hold humanlike, conversations with applications running on electronic devices.
In 2013 Artificial Solutions launched Lyra, a mobile personal assistant that is able to operate and remember the context of the conversation across different platforms and operating systems.

A new round of funding was announced in June 2013 to support expansion in the US market.

Since then the company has continued to develop the Teneo Platform and patent technology in the conversational AI sector including a framework for enabling chatbots to interact easily with each other.

In 2018, the company raised a total of 13.7 Euros in equity capital to help support global growth and to accelerate the expansion of Teneo.

In 2019, Artificial Solutions Holding completed the Reverse Takeover of Indentive, enabling the business of Artificial Solutions Holding to be traded on Nasdaq First North. Lawrence Flynn remains the CEO.

In November 2020, Per Ottosson took over as CEO. He is based at the company's headquarter in Stockholm together with the newly appointed CFO, Fredrik Törgren.

References

Natural language processing software
User interfaces
Applications of artificial intelligence
Natural language processing
Computational linguistics
Information retrieval organizations